Mathiasin is a French surname. Notable people with the surname include

 Jeanny Marc-Mathiasin (born 1950), French politician
 Max Mathiasin (born 1956), French politician

Surnames of French origin